Dirk-Willem van Gulik (born February 1968) is a founder of the Apache Software Foundation and contributor to the Apache Webserver project. Van Gulik is the former CTO of Joost, where he was terminated, and current Chief Technical Architect of British Broadcasting Corporation's Future Media and Technology. He has also worked for the United Nations and European Commission. Van Gulik is based in the Netherlands.

References

External links

1968 births
Living people
Dutch computer programmers
Businesspeople in information technology
University of Twente alumni